

Canelo may refer to:

Geography
 Canelo, Arizona, a ghost town
 Canelo Ranger Station
 Canelo School
 Canelo Hills in Arizona
 Canelo Hills Cienega Reserve, a protected area

People
 Canelo Álvarez (born 1990; birth name Santos Saúl Álvarez), Mexican professional boxer

Biology
 Canelo (tree), the common name for the tree Drimys winteri, native to Chile and Argentina
 Canelo ladies tresses orchid, common name of the orchid Spiranthes delitescens
 Canelo (moth), a moth genus in the geometer moth subfamily Nacophorini

Publishing
 Canelo (publisher), a British book publisher

See also
 Canelos, a rural parish in Pastaza Province, Ecuador
 El Canelo (disambiguation)